Winton "Wint" Allen Winter, Sr. (August 23, 1930 – May 4, 2013) was an American politician who served as a Republican member of the Kansas Senate, attorney, businessman, rancher and athlete.
Winter earned both a BA (1952) and JD (1956) at the University of Kansas. He also played football there.  He married Nancy Morsbach, and the couple had five children. He served in the United States Marine Corps as a captain in Korea. He first practiced law in Ottawa, Kansas in private practice and as a District Court judge. He served as Chairman of the Young Lawyers Division of the American Bar Association. He owned ranches and was also an owner of a significant Pizza Hut franchise. Winter was in the Kansas Senate from 1969 through 1980; his son Winton A. Winter, Jr. also served there. He founded Peoples, Inc. to acquire and hold community banks and served as its Chairman until his death.  Winter joined the University of Kansas Rugby Football Club as a competitive player at the age of 43 and continued playing with the club continuously through his 70s. He died of complications from Alzheimer's disease at the age of 82 in Lawrence, Kansas.

References 

1930 births
2013 deaths
United States Marine Corps personnel of the Korean War
Deaths from Alzheimer's disease
Neurological disease deaths in Kansas
Kansas lawyers
Republican Party Kansas state senators
United States Marine Corps officers
University of Kansas alumni
20th-century American lawyers
20th-century American politicians